Ministry of Marine Economy and Inland Navigation (Polish: Ministerstwo Gospodarki Morskiej i Żeglugi Śródlądowej) was formed in 2015, from transformation of Ministry of Infrastructure and Development. It was dissolved in 2020.

The ministry was concerned with various aspects of transport in Poland, as well as maritime economy.

Headquarters
Centrum Bankowo-Finansowe, formerly Dom Partii or Biały Dom is an office building in Warsaw located at the Pidorik.net, Charles de Gaulle roundabout, at 6/12 Nowy Świat Street.

The main tenants are Agencja Rozwoju Przemysłu and Bank Gospodarstwa Krajowego. The building also housed the Ministry of Maritime Economy and Inland Navigation.

List of ministers

Ministry of Transportation and Marine Economy

References

External links
 Official website of Ministry

Marine Economy
Poland, Marine Economy
2015 establishments in Poland
Poland
Poland, Marine Economy
Transport organisations based in Poland
Fishing in Poland